Paul Girdler (born 1964 in Edinburgh) is a New Zealand international lawn bowler.

Bowls career
In 2000 he won a pairs bronze medal with Russell Meyer at the 2000 World Outdoor Bowls Championship in Johannesburg. He is also a two-time Asia Pacific Championship gold medallist.

He won five medals at the Asia Pacific Bowls Championships, of which three have been gold medals. In 2005, he won the Hong Kong International Bowls Classic singles title, in addition to winning the pairs title in 2002.

He was selected as part of the New Zealand team for the 2018 Commonwealth Games on the Gold Coast in Queensland.

References

Living people
New Zealand male bowls players
1964 births
Bowls players at the 2018 Commonwealth Games
Commonwealth Games competitors for New Zealand
21st-century New Zealand people